"Jawaharlal Nehru Tropical Botanic Garden and Research Institute", (formerly Tropical Botanic Garden and Research Institute) renamed in the fond memory of visionary Prime Minister of India Shri Pandit Jawaharlal Nehru is an autonomous Institute established by the Government of Kerala on 17 November 1979 at Thiruvananthapuram, the capital city of Kerala. It functions under the umbrella of the Kerala State Council for Science, Technology and Environment (KSCSTE), Government of Kerala. The Royal Botanic Gardens (RBG), Kew played an exemplary and significant role in shaping and designing the lay out of the JNTBGRI garden in its formative stages.

The Institute undertakes research in conservation biology, Biotechnology, plant taxonomy, microbiology, phytochemistry, ethnomedicine and ethnophamacology, which are the main areas considered to have immediate relevance to the development of the garden. While taxonomists prepared a flora of the garden documenting the native plant wealth before mass introduction and face lift which subsequently followed, the bio-technologists mass multiplied plants of commercial importance, especially orchids for cultivation and distribution to the public.

JNTBGRI makes a comprehensive survey of the economic plant wealth of Kerala, to conserve, preserve and sustainably utilize the plant wealth. The institute carries out botanical, horticultural and chemical research for plant improvement and utilization; and offers facilities for the improvement of ornamental plants and propagation in the larger context of the establishment of nursery and flower trade. The cultivation and culturing of plants of India/other countries with comparable climatic condition for the economic benefit of Kerala/India is also taken care. Activities to help botanical teaching and to create public understanding of the value of plant research is initiated by JNTBGRI.  JNTBGRI gardens medicinal plants, ornamental plants and various introduced plants of economic or aesthetic value. JNTBGRI also serves as a source of supply of improved plants which are not readily available from other agencies.

Scientific researches on plant wealth are pursued through the following Divisions:

1. Garden Management, Education, Information and Training

2. Plant Genetic Resources

3. Biotechnology and Bioinformatics

4. Conservation Biology

5. Ethnomedicine and Ethnopharmacology

6. Phytochemistry and Phytopharmacology

7. Plant Systematics and Evolutionary Sciences

8. Microbiology

The major achievements of JNTBGRI at a glance 

 Developed a modern conservatory garden for ex-situ conservation of plants and scientific studies for sustainable utilization.
Established large living collection of trees and woody lianas (1000 species); Medicinal, Aromatic and Spice plants (1500 species), Pre-tsunami living collections from Andaman-Nicobar Islands (125 species), Orchids (600 species and 150 hybrids); Bamboos (60 species); Rare and Threatened plants( 550 species); Ferns and  Fern allies ( 165 species); Palms (105 species), Cyclades ( 35 species) and special groups like Zingibers ( 50 species), Bougainvillea, Aquatic plants, Insectivorous plants, Wild ornamentals, Wild Balsams, Jasmines, Begonias, Strobilanthes, Water lilies etc. for conservation, display and education. The living collections of trees, bamboos, orchids, Medicinal Aromatic and spice plants are the largest in South Asia.
Established a National Gene Bank for Medicinal and aromatic plants including a Meristem Bank, Seed Bank, Cryo Bank and a Field Gene Bank under the aegis of the Department of Biotechnology, Government of India.
Discovered family Lembosiaceae, genus Xanthagaricus of foliicolous fungi.
Discovered the genera Seidenfadeniella (2 species), Sivadasania (1 species) and over 100 species of flowering plants and discovered 40 species of flowering plants, believed to be extinct in the wild.
Undertaken studies on reproductive biology of selected RET trees, balsams, bamboos and orchids to evolve strategies for their effective conservation.
Produced 15 new orchid and bamboo hybrids having horticultural potential.
Introduced and evaluated 150 species of native plants based on their ornamental and landscape potential.
Recognized by Ministry of Environment and Forests (MoEF), Government of India as a lead institution for Biosphere programme and Centre for Research on orchids.
Maintaining a herbarium of Kerala Flora comprising 51,104 specimens (as per 2006 records), catering to the needs of students, researchers and scientists.
Developed tissue culture protocols for rapid multiplication of orchids, medicinal plants, bamboos and rattans leading to reintroduction and restoration of many of them.
Chemical profiling and DNA finger printing of medicinal plants.
Established a Bioinformatics Centre under DBT-BTIS programme of Government of India particularly focused the biological resources of Kerala.
Prepared a database on the Flora of Kerala.
Transferred the production technology of Jeevani (an immuno-enhancing, antifatigue, anti stress and hepatoprotective herbal drug) and SISAIROSP (a herbal formulation to control psoriasis and dandruff) for commercial manufacture.
Developed 12 new phytomedicines and filed 15 patents.
Published 25 books, 1,000 research papers, 20 handouts/bulletins/course materials.
Carried out Environmental Impact Assessment Studies (EIA) on different hydroelectric projects and offered Environmental Management Plan to KSEB to take up various protective measures for safeguarding biodiversity.
A new tree species of the genus Cryptocarya spotted in Edamalakkudy in Idukki district has been named after a tribe from the locality.

The objectives of JNTBGRI

 To carry out botanical, horticultural and chemical research for plant improvement and utilization.
 To organize germplasm collections of economic plants of interest to the state in the case of those species for which separate centers are not already in existence.
 To establish a model production center for translating the fruits of research to public advantage leading to plant-based industrial ventures.
 To establish an arboretum in approximately half the area of the Garden, with representative specimens of trees of Kerala and India, and trees of economic value from other tropical areas of the world.
 To prepare a flora of Kerala.
 To establish tissue culture facility with special reference to the improvement of seeds/fruits/flowers and quick and easy propagation.
 To be engaged in garden planning and research.
 To do chemical screening of plants of potential medicinal importance.
 To work in collaboration with similar institutes in India and outside
 To promote and establish modern scientific research and development studies relating to plants of importance to India and to Kerala in particular.

Gallery

External links 

  JNTBGRI official website
 Department of Biotechnology, Government of India
 Rajiv Gandhi Centre for Biotechnology, Thiruvananthapuram

State agencies of Kerala
Indian forest research institutes
Research institutes in Kerala
Botanical gardens in India
Research institutes in Thiruvananthapuram
Botanical research institutes
Gene banks
1979 establishments in Kerala
Educational institutions established in 1979
Research institutes established in 1979
Environmental organisations based in India